Rudbeckia californica is a species of flowering plant in the family Asteraceae, known by the common name California coneflower.

Habitat and range
It is native to California, where it grows in the Sierra Nevada, the Klamath Mountains, and northern coastal areas. It can be found in moist habitat types, such as mountain meadows and streambanks.

Growth pattern
It is an erect perennial herb growing from a thick rhizome, its stem exceeding one meter in maximum height and sometimes approaching two meters. It usually has no branches.

Leaves
Most of the large leaves are basal, with a few alternately arranged along the stem. The leaves can be up to 30 centimeters long and are lance-shaped to oval, smooth-edged or lobed.

Inflorescence and fruit
The inflorescence is a usually solitary sunflower-like flower head with a base up to 6 centimeters wide lined with several ray florets, each of which are 2 to 6 centimeters long. The yellow ray florets extend outwards and then become reflexed, pointing back along the stem. The disc florets filling the button-shaped to conical to cylindrical center of the head are greenish yellow.

The fruits are achenes each about half a centimeter long tipped with a pappus of scales.

Comments
One variety of this species, var. intermedia, is now generally treated as a species in its own right named Rudbeckia klamathensis, the Klamath coneflower.

References

External links
Jepson Manual Treatment
USDA Plants Profile
Flora of North America
Photo gallery

californica
Flora of California
Flora without expected TNC conservation status